Eirik Schulze (born 7 January 1993) is a Norwegian footballer who plays as a midfielder for Start.

Schulze was born in Mandal. He transferred from Mandalskameratene to Viking in 2011. He made three appearances for the club in Tippeligaen, one in 2011 and two in 2013, but was released from his contract after the 2013 season. Ahead of the 2014 season he joined Strømmen IF. In the summer of 2019 Schulze signed a deal with Start beginning from 1 January 2020.

Career statistics

References

External links
 

1993 births
Living people
People from Mandal, Norway
Norwegian footballers
Association football midfielders
Mandalskameratene players
Viking FK players
Strømmen IF players
Sandnes Ulf players
Sogndal Fotball players
IK Start players
Eliteserien players
Norwegian First Division players
Sportspeople from Agder